|}

The Prix de l'Arc de Triomphe is a Group 1 flat horse race in France open to thoroughbreds aged three years or older. It is run at Longchamp Racecourse in Paris, France, over a distance of 2,400 metres and scheduled to take place each year, usually on the first Sunday in October.

Popularly referred to as the "Arc", it is the world's most prestigious all-aged horse race. Its roll of honour features many highly acclaimed horses, and its winners are often subsequently regarded as champions. It is currently the world's second-richest turf race (behind The Everest).

A slogan of the Prix de l'Arc de Triomphe, first used on a promotional poster in 2003, describes the event as "Ce n'est pas une course, c'est un monument" – "It's not a race, it's a monument".

History

Origins

The Société d'Encouragement, a former governing body of French racing, had initially restricted its races to thoroughbreds born and bred in France. In 1863, it launched the Grand Prix de Paris, an event designed to bring together the best three-year-olds from any country. Thirty years later it introduced the Prix du Conseil Municipal, an international race for the leading horses of different age groups. It was run over 2,400 metres in October, with weights determined by a horse's previous performances.

The creation of a third such race was proposed at a committee meeting on 24 January 1920. The new event would complement the Grand Prix de Paris and serve as a showcase for French thoroughbred breeding. It would have similar characteristics to the Prix du Conseil Municipal, but each horse would compete on equal terms, unpenalised for previous victories.

Coming in the wake of World War I, it was decided that the race would be named after the Arc de Triomphe, a famous monument which had been the scene of a victory parade by the Allies in 1919. The chosen title had been previously assigned to a minor event at Longchamp. Another suggested title was the "Prix de la Victoire".

Race history

The Prix de l'Arc de Triomphe was first run on Sunday 3 October 1920. The inaugural running was won by Comrade, a three-year-old colt owned by Evremond de Saint-Alary. The winner's prize was 150,000 francs.

In 1935, the event secured state funding by the means of a lottery, which awarded prizes according to the race result and the drawing of lots. The system was first used in 1936, and it continued until 1938. The "Arc" was cancelled twice during World War II, in 1939 and 1940. It was run at Le Tremblay with a distance of 2,300 metres in 1943 and 1944.

Government funding of the race resumed in 1949, with money obtained through the Loterie Nationale. Offering an attractive jackpot of 50 million francs, this enabled a rapid increase of the prizes for both the "Arc" and its supporting races. By the 1970s, however, the assistance of the lottery had diminished, and the system was finally discontinued after the 1982 running. Since then the "Arc" has had several sponsors, including Trusthouse Forte, CIGA Hotels and Groupe Lucien Barrière.

The present sponsor of the Prix de l'Arc de Triomphe is the Qatar Racing and Equestrian Club (QREC). The sponsorship agreement was signed in Doha in 2008, and as a result the prize fund was doubled from €2 million to €4 million. Now, the prize for the Arc is worth €5 000 000 which makes it the richest flat race on turf. Arc Weekend now includes seven races classed at Group 1 level, and four with Group 2 status. It also features the Arabian World Cup, the world's richest race for purebred Arabian horses with €1 000 000 prize-money.

Due to renovations at the Hippodrome de Longchamp the 2016 and 2017 editions of the Prix de l'Arc de Triomphe took place in Chantilly.

Records
Most successful horse (2 wins):

 Ksar – 1921, 1922
 Motrico – 1930, 1932
 Corrida – 1936, 1937
 Tantieme – 1950, 1951
 Ribot – 1955, 1956
 Alleged – 1977, 1978
 Treve – 2013, 2014
 Enable – 2017, 2018

<div style="font-size:90%">
Leading jockey (6 wins):

 Frankie Dettori – Lammtarra (1995), Sakhee (2001), Marienbard (2002), Golden Horn (2015), Enable (2017, 2018)

Leading trainer (8 wins):
 André Fabre – Trempolino (1987), Subotica (1992), Carnegie (1994), Peintre Celebre (1997), Sagamix (1998), Hurricane Run (2005), Rail Link (2006), Waldgeist (2019)

Leading owner (6 wins):
 Marcel Boussac – Corrida (1936, 1937), Djebel (1942), Ardan (1944), Caracalla (1946), Coronation (1949)
 Khalid Abdullah – Rainbow Quest (1985), Dancing Brave (1986), Rail Link (2006), Workforce (2010), Enable (2017, 2018)

Fastest winning time – Found (2016), 2m 23.61s (at Chantilly)

Widest winning margin – Ribot (1956), Sea Bird (1965) and Sakhee (2001), 6 lengthsOldest winning horse – Motrico (1932), aged 7 years

Most runners – 30, in 1967

Fewest runners – 7, in 1941
</div>

Winners

 Cadum finished first in 1925, but he was relegated to second place for hampering Priori.

 The 1943 and 1944 editions were run at Le Tremblay over 2,300 metres.

 Midnight Sun dead-heated for first in 1959, but he was placed second for hampering Saint Crespin.

 Sagace finished first in 1985, but he was demoted to second for bumping Rainbow Quest.

 The 2016 and 2017 runnings took place at Chantilly while Longchamp was closed for redevelopment.

Analysis

See also

 List of French flat horse races

References

 France Galop (1979–1989) / Racing Post (1990–present) :

 galop.courses-france.com :
 1920–1949, 1950–1979, 1980–2009
 france-galop.com – A Brief History: Prix de l'Arc de Triomphe. galopp-sieger.de – Prix de l'Arc de Triomphe. horseracingintfed.com – International Federation of Horseracing Authorities – Prix de l'Arc de Triomphe (2018). pedigreequery.com – Prix de l'Arc de Triomphe – Longchamp. prixarcdetriomphe.com – Prix de l'Arc de Triomphe – Official website. tbheritage.com – Prix de l'Arc de Triomphe.''
 
 
 Race Recordings 

 
Open middle distance horse races
Longchamp Racecourse
Horse races in France
Recurring sporting events established in 1920
16th arrondissement of Paris
1920 establishments in France
Sports competitions in Paris
October sporting events